The Zimbabwe women's cricket team toured Namibia in January 2019 to play a five-match Women's Twenty20 International (WT20I) series known as the Namib Desert Challenge. These were the first matches with WT20I status to be played by Zimbabwe after the International Cricket Council announced that all matches played between women's teams of Associate Members after 1 July 2018 would have full T20I status. The venue for all of the matches was the Sparta Cricket Club Ground in Walvis Bay. Zimbabwe won the series 5–0.

The tournament provided both teams with some preparation ahead of the 2019 ICC Women's Qualifier Africa.

WT20I series

1st WT20I

2nd WT20I

3rd WT20I

4th WT20I

5th WT20I

References

External links
 Series home at ESPN Cricinfo

Cricket in Namibia
Cricket in Zimbabwe
International cricket competitions in 2018–19